1921 in Argentine football saw Huracán winning its first Asociación Argentine title while Racing Club won the dissident Asociación Amateur championship.

Primera División

Asociación Argentina de Football - Copa Campeonato
Banfield disaffiliated from the association moving to the rival Asociación Amateurs de Football with a few fixtures disputed.

Asociación Amateurs de Football
Racing Club won its 8th title. General Mitre, which had debuted at Primera after promoting last year, was expelled from the association after playing 17 fixtures and all its matches annulled.

Lower divisions

Primera B
AFA Champion: Sportivo Dock Sud
AAm Champion: Palermo

Primera C
AFA Champion: Huracán III
AAm Champion: Villa Crespo

Domestic cups

Copa de Competencia Jockey Club
Champion: Sportivo Barracas

Final

Copa Ibarguren
Champion: Newell's

Final

References

 
Seasons in Argentine football
1921 in South American football